The North China Transportation Company (華北交通株式会社, Japanese: Kahoku Kōtsū kabushiki gaisha, Chinese: Huáběi Jiāotōng Zhūshì Huìshè) was a transportation company in the territory of the collaborationist Provisional Government of the Republic of China during the Japanese occupation.

History
After Japan occupied a large part of northern China during the Sino-Japanese War, it set up a puppet government known as the Provisional Government of the Republic of China. In 1938, the Provisional Government nationalised the various railway and bus companies in its jurisdiction, after which the South Manchuria Railway set up a subsidiary, called the North China Transportation Company, to operate the railways and bus services within the Provisional Government's territory. With its headquarters in Beijing, the NCTC at its peak employed 110,000 people, of which 70% were Chinese. The company was liquidated in 1945 following Japan's defeat in the Pacific War, and the railways were taken over by the China Railway.

Amongst the railway companies that were nationalised were:

 Beining Railway - previously known as the Peking−Mukden Railway; Beijing−Shanhaiguan section only; the Shanhaiguan−Fengtian section was taken over by the Manchukuo National Railway in 1933;
 Jiaoji Railway;
 Jinghan Railway;
 Jingsui Railway - Beijing−Guisui (Hohhot), now part of the Beijing–Baotou Railway;
 Longhai Railway;
 Tongpu Railway - originally narrow gauge, but soon converted to standard gauge;
 Zhengtai Railway - originally narrow gauge, later converted to standard gauge, becoming the Shitai Line.

Routes
 Boshan Line (博山線) Zhangdian-Boshan (張店～博山)
Hongshan Line (黌山線) Zichuan-Hongshan (淄川～黌山)
 Jiaoji Trunk Line (膠済幹線) Qingdao-Jinan (青島～済南)
 Jingbao Trunk Line (京包幹線) Beijing-Baotou (北京～包頭)[1] 
 Jinggu Trunk Line (京古幹線) Beijing-Gubeikou(北京～古北口)
 Jinghan Trunk Line (京漢幹線) Beijing-Hankou (北京～漢口)
 Jingshan Line (京山線) Beijing-Shanhaiguan (北京～山海関)
 Jinpu Trunk Line (津浦幹線) Tianjin-Xuzhou (天津～徐州)
 Longhai Trunk Line (隴海幹線) Lianyun-Kaifeng (連雲～開封)
 Shimen Trunk Line (石門幹線) Shimen-Dexian (石門～徳縣)
 Shitai Trunk Line (石太幹線) Shimen-Taiyuan (石門～太原)
 Tongpu Trunk Line (同蒲幹線) Datong- (大同～蒲州)

Rolling stock

Locomotives of the North China Transportation Company used the same classification system used by the South Manchuria Railway between 1938 and 1945.

Locomotives

Standard gauge

Narrow gauge

Services

The North China Transportation Company ran a number of long-distance trains, both within China and in conjunction with the South Manchuria Railway and the Chosen Government Railway. Notable trains include the "Tairiku" ("Continental") and "Kōa" limited express trains between Beijing and Busan, Korea. The "Tairiku" entered service in 1938, making the trip from Busan to Beijing in 37.5 hours in 1940; the train was discontinued in 1944. The observation car used on this train is preserved at the Beijing Railway Museum. The "Kōa" was put into operation in 1939, making the same trip in 39.5 hours in 1940, but by 1945 the trip took 49 hours. The "Kōa" was discontinued after the Japanese defeat in the Pacific War.

References

External links
 North China Transportation Company Photo Archive

Defunct railway companies of Japan
Standard gauge railways in China
Defunct railway companies of China